Rajesh Vivek Upadhyay (31 January 1949 – 14 January 2016) was an Indian actor. He is best known to Hindi film audiences for his role as the astrologer Guran in Lagaan (2001) and as the postmaster Nivaran in Swades (2004). He had also played role of Vyasa, author of the Hindu epic Mahabharata, in the popular Indian series Mahabharat. He made his mark as a villain in the beginning with films like Veerana (1988) and Joshilaay (1989), often playing the role of a henchman, and later took to portraying comedic and supporting characters. His other credits include Mujhse Shaadi Karogi, What's Your Raashee? and Bunty Aur Babli. Rajesh is also noted for his roles in the historic TV series Bharat Ek Khoj and in the TV Serial Aghori. He was hired for an ad series of Cadbury 5 Star as the father of the two sons.

Biography
Vivek was born on 31 January 1949 in Jaunpur, Uttar Pradesh. He obtained his Master of Arts degree in Ancient history & Archaeology from T. D. Degree College, Jaunpur, and trained at the National School of Drama in acting. Filmmaker Shyam Benegal first introduced him in films with his film Junoon (1978).

Rajesh died on 14 January 2016 at the age of 66 due to a massive heart attack while shooting for a film at Hyderabad.

Filmography

Film

Television

References

External links
 
 

Indian male film actors
2016 deaths
1949 births